Ulderico Di Blas (1 March 1907 - ?) was an Italian sprinter bronze medal at the 1933 International University Games.

Achievements

See also
 Italy at the 1934 European Athletics Championships

References

External links
 Ulderico Di Blas at The-Sports.org

1907 births
Year of death unknown
Place of death unknown
Italian male sprinters